is a Japanese politician of the Constitutional Democratic Party of Japan, and a member of the House of Representatives in the Diet (national legislature). He studied at Waseda University.

References

External links 
 Official website in Japanese.

1961 births
Living people
People from Kagoshima
Politicians from Kagoshima Prefecture
Members of the House of Representatives (Japan)
Constitutional Democratic Party of Japan politicians
21st-century Japanese politicians